Scipio Africanus: The Defeat of Hannibal (Italian title:  is a 1937 Italian historical propaganda film directed by Carmine Gallone about Scipio Africanus from the time of his election as proconsul until his defeat of Hannibal at the Battle of Zama. The film received financial backing from Benito Mussolini's dictatorship and its production was overseen by Vittorio Mussolini.

Plot
Publius Cornelius Scipio is selected to serve as consul following the Battle of Cannae. Scipio defeats Hasdrubal in Spain before defeating Hannibal at the Battle of Zama. Queen Sophonisba is captured and commits suicide by drinking poison.

Cast
Annibale Ninchi as Scipio Africanus
Camillo Pilotto as Hannibal
Fosco Giachetti as Captain Masinissa
Francesca Braggiotti as Queen Sophonisba
Marcello Giorda as Syphax
Guglielmo Barnabò as Furius
Isa Miranda as Velia
Memo Benassi as Cato the Elder
Franco Coop as Mezio
Ciro Galvani as Quintus Fabius Maximus Verrucosus
Carlo Lombardi as Lucius
Marcello Spada as Arunte
Piero Carnabuci as Il Reduce della Battaglia
Carlo Ninchi as Lelius
Lamberto Picasso as Hasdrubal

Production

Benito Mussolini sought to revive Italian cinema after it was hurt by multiple box-office failures in the 1920s. His son Vittorio Mussolini oversaw the production of the film. He refused to use miniatures and sets up to 175 feet were built by 500 workers.

The film was shot over the course of 232 days from 10 August 1936 to 29 March 1937, near Sabaudia with 12.6 million lira invested by the Italian government. 20 principal actors, 38 secondary actors, 44,425 extras, 26,671 crew members, 174,610 military personnel, 3,171 horses, and 50 elephants were used for the film. 500 camels for a three minute scene and 100 seaworthy galleys were used. The film cost around twenty times more than the average Italian film of the time.

The scene depicting the Battle of Zama used 12,000 soldiers and 1,000 Libyan horsemen. Sixteen soldiers were injured during the filming of the battle. The soldiers were then transferred to duty in the Spanish Civil War. Tobis Film participated in the film's production and required that Hannibal's soldiers be Aryans.

On 10 June 1936, Giacomo Paulucci, president of ENIC, asked Ildebrando Pizzetti to compose the film's score. It was the first film that Pizzetti worked on although he was offered the role to compose Cabiria. The score was completed by spring 1937, and Pizzetti performed one of its songs before Benito Mussolini on 28 April in Cinecittà using the orchestra and chorus of the Teatro dell'Opera di Roma. Mussolini considered adopting Pizzetti's Inno a Roma as the national anthem of Italy according to Luigi Freddi.

Carmine Gallone was selected to direct the film, but Italian officials criticized his failure to prevent historical inaccuracies in the film, including extras wearing watches and telephone wires in the background of the Battle of Zama. Gallone argued against cutting the scenes featuring the inaccuracies due to them being needed for continuity and the scenes remained in the film. Gallone, Camillo Mariani dell'Aguillara, S.A. Luciani, and Silvio Maurano wrote the film. The film's cinematography was done by Ubaldo Arata and Anchise Brizzi.

Freddi stated that the "political aim of Scipione l'africano is not banal propaganda, it is the expression of the transcendent continuity in our history which transmits into the Black Shirt legionary the living and vibrant echo of the legionary at Zama".

Release
Benito Mussolini was shown the film on 4 August 1937. The film was shown at the Venice Film Festival on 25 August, where it received the Coppa Mussolini for Best Italian Film. The film was distributed by Esperia Film Distribution in the United States.

Reception
The June-July issue of Bianco e Nero was soley devoted the coverage of the film. Variety stated that the film was "undramatic and wooden". Bosley Crowther, writing in The New York Times, stated that "there are moments in the film when one feels that it is not so much the noble days of Republican Rome that one is witnessing as the last act of Aida".

Time's review of the film stated that it "is also as spectacular a show as the movies have seen since the Italian Quo Vadis first made the U.S. spectacle-conscious".

See also
 list of historical drama films
 List of films set in ancient Rome

References

Works cited

External links
 

1937 films
1930s biographical films
1930s historical films
Italian biographical films
Italian black-and-white films
Italian historical films
Italian epic films
Peplum films
1930s Italian-language films
Films directed by Carmine Gallone
Films scored by Ildebrando Pizzetti
Films set in ancient Rome
Films set in Carthage
Second Punic War films
Sword and sandal films
Fascist propaganda
Cultural depictions of Hannibal
Cultural depictions of Scipio Africanus
Cultural depictions of Sophonisba
1930s Italian films